Events from the year 1595 in Ireland.

Incumbent
Monarch: Elizabeth I

Events
Ongoing – Nine Years' War: Rebellion of Hugh O'Neill, 2nd Earl of Tyrone and Hugh Roe O'Donnell of Tyrconnell (lasts until 1603).
March 25–27  – Battle of Clontibret in County Monaghan: Tyrone's forces achieve victory over English troops led by Sir Henry Bagenal in the first major action of the Nine Years' War.
September 4 – Lieutenant Colonel Richard Wingfield is wounded in a clash with Tyrone's troops in Ulster. He is knighted by the Lord Deputy of Ireland, Sir William Russell, in Christ Church Cathedral, Dublin, on 9 November before returning to England.

Births
Daniel O'Daly, diplomat and historian (d. 1662)
Approximate date – John Barnewall, Franciscan friar (d. c.1650)

Deaths
March 2 – John Garvey, Archbishop of Armagh (Church of Ireland) (b. 1527)
Seamus Ó hÉilidhe, Archbishop of Tuam (Roman Catholic).
Turlough Luineach O'Neill, clan leader (b. 1532)

References

 
1590s in Ireland
Ireland
Years of the 16th century in Ireland